This is an incomplete list of Fabian Tracts of The Fabian Society published from 1916 that continues the List of Fabian Tracts to 1915.

Entries are in the form Tract Number/Title/Author.

1916 
179. John Ruskin and social ethics. Edith J. Morley. (Published 1917?)

180. The Philosophy of Socialism. [[
Arthur Clutton-Brock|A. Clutton Brock]].

181. When Peace Comes: The Way of Industrial Reconstruction. Sidney Webb.

1917
182. Robert Owen, idealist. C.E.M. Joad.

183. The reform of the House of Lords. Sidney Webb.

184. The Russian Revolution and British Democracy. Julius West.

1918
185. The abolition of the poor law. Beatrice Webb.

186. Central Africa and the League of Nations. R C Hawkin

187. The teacher in politics. Sidney Webb

1919 to 2000 
See Digital Library online reference listing tracts to No. 597 in 2000.

References

Tracts
Lists of books by imprint or publisher
Books about politics of England
Lists of British books
United Kingdom politics-related lists